The Message is the debut studio album by British singer Andrea Begley. The album was released in the United Kingdom on 21 October 2013 by Capitol Records. The album has peaked to number 7 on the UK Albums Chart and number 61 on the Irish Albums Chart.

Singles
 "My Immortal" was released as the lead single from the album in June 2013. The single has peaked to number 30 on the UK Singles Chart and number 70 on the Irish Singles Chart.
 "Dancing in the Dark" was released as the second single from the album in October 2013.

Track listing

Chart performance

Release history

See also
List of UK top-ten albums in 2013

References

2013 albums
Andrea Begley albums